Yusuf Karagöz (born 5 October 1999) is a Turkish professional footballer who plays as a goalkeeper for the Süper Lig club Alanyaspor.

Club career
Karagöz was born in İskenderun, and moved to Alanya in 2008. He joined the youth academy of İkizler in 2010, and from there joined the academies of Antalya Özerspor and Alanyaspor. He signed his first professional contract with Alanyaspor in 2018. He started his senior career with successive loans to Erzinspor, Batman Petrolspor and Edirnespor in the TFF Third League, before returning to Alanyaspor as the reserve goalkeeper. He made his professional debut with Alanyaspor in a 1–0 Süper Lig loss to Sivasspor on 25 April 2022.

References

External links
 
 
 TFF Profile Archive

1999 births
Living people
People from İskenderun
Turkish footballers
Association football goalkeepers
Alanyaspor footballers
Batman Petrolspor footballers
Edirnespor footballers
Süper Lig players
TFF Third League players
Sportspeople from Hatay